Anna Demetrio (1890–1959) was an Italian-born American film actress. Speaking English with a heavy accent, she often played stock foreign characters in a series of supporting roles. In 1950 she starred in the sitcom Mama Rosa in which she played the title character.

Selected filmography

 Too Much Harmony (1933)
 Manhattan Merry-Go-Round (1937)
 In Old Mexico (1938)
 Escape to Paradise (1939)
 Young Buffalo Bill (1940)
 Miss V from Moscow (1942)
 Submarine Base (1943)
 Dragon Seed (1944)
 Call of the South Seas (1944)
 Appointment with Murder (1948)
 September Affair (1950)

References

Bibliography
 McLaughlin, Robert. We'll Always Have the Movies: American Cinema during World War II. University Press of Kentucky, 2006.

External links

1890 births
1959 deaths
Italian emigrants to the United States
Italian film actresses
American film actresses
Actresses from Rome
20th-century American actresses